In statistical analysis of binary classification, the F-score or F-measure is a measure of a test's accuracy. It is calculated from the precision and recall of the test, where the precision is the number of true positive results divided by the number of all positive results, including those not identified correctly, and the recall is the number of true positive results divided by the number of all samples that should have been identified as positive. Precision is also known as positive predictive value, and recall is also known as sensitivity in diagnostic binary classification. 

The F1 score is the harmonic mean of the precision and recall. It thus symmetrically represents both precision and recall in one metric. The more generic  score applies additional weights, valuing one of precision or recall more than the other.

The highest possible value of an F-score is 1.0, indicating perfect precision and recall, and the lowest possible value is 0, if either precision or recall are zero.

Etymology 
The name F-measure is believed to be named after a different F function in Van Rijsbergen's book, when introduced to the Fourth Message Understanding Conference (MUC-4, 1992).

Definition 

The traditional F-measure or balanced F-score (F1 score) is the harmonic mean of precision and recall:

.

Fβ score 

A more general F score, that uses a positive real factor , where  is chosen such that recall is considered  times as important as precision, is:
.

In terms of Type I and type II errors this becomes:

.

The F-measure was derived so that  "measures the effectiveness of retrieval with respect to a user who attaches  times as much importance to recall as precision". It is based on Van Rijsbergen's effectiveness measure

.

Their relationship is  where .

Diagnostic testing 

This is related to the field of binary classification where recall is often termed "sensitivity".

Dependence of the F-score on class imbalance 

Precision-recall curve, and thus the  score, explicitly depends on the ratio 
 of positive to negative test cases.
This means that comparison of the
F-score across different problems with differing class ratios is
problematic. One way to address this issue (see e.g., Siblini et al,
2020
) is to use a standard class ratio  when making such comparisons.

Applications 

The F-score is often used in the field of information retrieval for measuring search, document classification, and query classification performance. Earlier works focused primarily on the F1 score, but with the proliferation of large scale search engines, performance goals changed to place more emphasis on either precision or recall and so  is seen in wide application.

The F-score is also used in machine learning. However, the F-measures do not take true negatives into account, hence measures such as the Matthews correlation coefficient, Informedness or  Cohen's kappa may be preferred to assess the performance of a binary classifier.

The F-score has been widely used in the natural language processing literature, such as in the evaluation of named entity recognition and word segmentation.

Properties 

The F1 score is the Dice coefficient of the set of retrieved items and the set of relevant items.

Criticism 
David Hand and others criticize the widespread use of the F1 score since it gives equal importance to precision and recall. In practice, different types of mis-classifications incur different costs. In other words, the relative importance of precision and recall is an aspect of the problem.

According to Davide Chicco and Giuseppe Jurman, the F1 score is less truthful and informative than the Matthews correlation coefficient (MCC) in binary evaluation classification.

David Powers has pointed out that F1 ignores the True Negatives and thus is misleading for unbalanced classes, while kappa and correlation measures are symmetric and assess both directions of predictability - the classifier predicting the true class and the true class predicting the classifier prediction, proposing separate multiclass measures Informedness and Markedness for the two directions, noting that their geometric mean is correlation.

Another source of critique of F1, is its lack of symmetry. It means it may change its value when dataset labeling is changed - the "positive" samples are named "negative" and vice versa.
This criticism is met by the P4 metric definition, which is sometimes indicated as a symmetrical extension of F1.

Difference from Fowlkes–Mallows index

While the F-measure is the harmonic mean of recall and precision, the Fowlkes–Mallows index is their geometric mean.

Extension to multi-class classification

The F-score is also used for evaluating classification problems with more than two classes (Multiclass classification). In this setup, the final score is obtained by micro-averaging (biased by class frequency) or macro-averaging (taking all classes as equally important). For macro-averaging, two different formulas have been used by applicants: the F-score of (arithmetic) class-wise precision and recall means or the arithmetic mean of class-wise F-scores, where the latter exhibits more desirable properties.

See also
 BLEU
 Confusion matrix
 Hypothesis tests for accuracy
 METEOR
 NIST (metric)
 Receiver operating characteristic
 ROUGE (metric)
 Uncertainty coefficient, aka Proficiency
 Word error rate
 LEPOR

References 

Statistical natural language processing
Evaluation of machine translation
Statistical ratios
Summary statistics for contingency tables
Clustering criteria

de:Beurteilung eines Klassifikators#Kombinierte Maße